Verdun pri Uršnih Selih is a small settlement in the Municipality of Dolenjske Toplice in Slovenia. It lies west of Uršna Sela in the historical region of Lower Carniola. The municipality is included in the Southeast Slovenia Statistical Region.

Name
The name of the settlement was changed from Verdun to Verdun pri Uršnih selih (literally, 'Verdun near Uršna Sela') in 1953. The name Verdun is derived from the Romance word *(g)uardōne(m), based on the Germanic word *wardō 'guard'. Although this place name can be understood in a military sense, it is likely that it referred instead to a place where herdsmen guarded their animals.

References

External links
Verdun pri Uršnih Selih on Geopedia

Populated places in the Municipality of Dolenjske Toplice